USS Carlisle (APA-69) was a Gilliam-class attack transport that served with the United States Navy from 1944 to 1946. She was sunk as a target ship during Operation Crossroads in July 1946.

History
Carlisle was named after a county in Kentucky. She was launched 30 July 1944 by Consolidated Steel at San Pedro, California, under a Maritime Commission contract; acquired by the Navy 28 November 1944 and commissioned the next day.

World War II
Carlisle cleared San Diego 23 January 1945, carrying sailors, marines, and general cargo to Pearl Harbor. She returned to San Francisco 11 February, and after repairs, sailed to San Diego to load passengers and cargo for Pearl Harbor. Between 2 April and 5 June, she had duty training and transporting Marine units among the islands of the Hawaiian group.

After hostilities
Carlisle made three voyages to the west coast from Hawaii and Japan, and shorter passages among South Pacific islands, redeploying servicemen until 4 February 1946.

Operation Crossroads
Carlisle was then assigned as a target vessel for Operation Crossroads, the atomic bomb tests at Bikini Atoll, and was sunk in one of those tests on 1 July 1946.  Carlisle  was decommissioned at Bikini Atoll and struck from the Navy Register, both dates unknown.

Decorations
Carlisle received two Navy Occupation Service Medals for service during the occupation of Japan after World War II.

References

APA-69 Carlisle, Navsource Online.

Gilliam-class attack transports
Transports of the United States Navy
World War II auxiliary ships of the United States
World War II amphibious warfare vessels of the United States
Carlisle County, Kentucky
Ships built in Los Angeles
1944 ships
Ships involved in Operation Crossroads
Ships sunk as targets
Maritime incidents in 1946